Clyde Hart (born 1935) is the director of track and field at Baylor University. Hart retired as head coach for the Baylor track program on June 14, 2005 after 42 years with the program.

Hart is primarily known as the only coach to have instructed Michael Johnson, the gold medal winner in the individual 400 meters at the 1996 and 2000 Summer Olympics

Hart also recruited and coached Jeremy Wariner and Darold Williamson to gold medals in the 2004 Summer Olympics in Athens, Greece — Wariner in the individual 400 meters, and both in the 4x400 meter relay. Wariner and Hart briefly parted ways in 2008, reuniting a year later .

Another one of his pupils, Greg Haughton, won bronze at the 2000 Summer Olympics in Sydney, and he currently coaches Sanya Richards, the top-ranked female 400 runner in the world in 2007 and the 2012 Summer Olympics gold medalist.

Hart was a state champion sprinter at Hot Springs, Arkansas and graduated from Baylor University in 1956 with a Bachelor's degree and later the University of Arkansas with a Master's degree.

He is married to Maxine Hart.

Awards and accolades
In 2017, Hart was awarded the Legend Coach Award by USA Track & Field.

References

1935 births
Living people
American track and field coaches
Baylor Bears men's track and field athletes
Sportspeople from Hot Springs, Arkansas
University of Arkansas alumni